Leoville is a village in the Canadian province of Saskatchewan within the Rural Municipality of Spiritwood No. 496 and Census Division No. 16. The village is located along Highway 24 (named the worst road in Saskatchewan by the CAA in 2014).  Highway 946 begins in the village and proceeds north. Leoville is home to the administrative centre of the Pelican Lake First Nation band government.

History 
Leoville incorporated as a village on June 26, 1944.

Demographics 

See also 

 List of communities in Saskatchewan
 Villages of Saskatchewan
 Leoville Airport

References

Villages in Saskatchewan
Spiritwood No. 496, Saskatchewan
Division No. 16, Saskatchewan
Pelican Lake First Nation